Nostitz refers to

 Nostitz (Weißenberg), a place in Saxony, Germany
 Nostitz family, a Silesian aristocratic family named after the place, including a list of notable family members

See also